Bryan D. Wood (born March 10, 1944) is a Canadian former curler. He was the lead on the Don Duguid rink that won two Curling Championships and two Brier Championships. He also won the 1979 Macdonald Brier playing for Barry Fry.

Wood was inducted into the Manitoba Sports Hall of Fame in 2007.

References

External links

 Bryan Wood – Curling Canada Stats Archive
 Video:  (channel "Curling Canada")

Living people
Curlers from Manitoba
1944 births
Brier champions
World curling champions
Canadian male curlers